Space Daze 2000: A Mind Journey of Electronic Ambient Space Rock is a various artists compilation album released on February 20, 1996 by Cleopatra Records.

Reception

AllMusic critic Stephen Thomas Erlewine awarded Space Daze 2000 four and a half out of five stars and called the collection "groundbreaking" and "an excellent sampling of ambient music."

Track listing

Personnel
Adapted from the Space Daze 2000: A Mind Journey of Electronic Ambient Space Rock liner notes.

 Carl Edwards – design
 Judson Leach – mastering

Release history

References

External links 
 Vampire Themes at Discogs (list of releases)

1996 compilation albums
Cleopatra Records compilation albums